Henry Houry (1874–1972) was a French stage actor. He also appeared in and directed films. He worked for a while in the United States during the silent era, directing the 1918 Corinne Griffith film Love Watches.

Selected filmography
 Love Watches (1918)
 Koenigsmark (1923)
 Heart of an Actress (1924)
 The House of Mystery (1933)
 The Alibi (1937)
 The Woman Who Dared (1944)
 Dominique (1950)
 The Convict (1951)

References

Bibliography
 Waldman, Harry & Slide, Anthony. Hollywood and the Foreign Touch: A Dictionary of Foreign Filmmakers and Their Films from America, 1910-1995. Scarecrow Press, 1996.

External links

1874 births
1972 deaths
French male film actors
French male silent film actors
French male stage actors
Film directors from Paris
20th-century French male actors